Exie is an unincorporated community in Green County, Kentucky, United States.  It lies at the intersection of U.S. Route 68 with Kentucky Routes 487 and 745, south of the city of Greensburg, the county seat of Green County.  Its elevation is 801 feet (245 m).

A post office was established in the community in 1890 and named for schoolteacher Exie Dowdy.

References

Unincorporated communities in Green County, Kentucky
Unincorporated communities in Kentucky